Jaborandi is a Brazilian municipality of the state of São Paulo, located 491 kilometers from the state capital, São Paulo. The population is 6,946 (2020 estimate) in an area of 273 km².

History
A settlement was founded in 1902 on the right bank of the stream Jaborandi, which takes its name from the plant jaborandi, which grows abundantly on its banks. In 1924 the district of Jaborandy was created. In 1949 Jaborandi was separated from the municipality of Colina and became an independent municipality.

Geography
Located in the northern part of the state, Jaborandi is 491 km from the city of São Paulo. The bordering munícipalities are Barretos, Morro Agudo, Terra Roxa and Colina. Its altitude is 493 meters. It has fertile lands (dark red latosol). The main river is the Rio Pardo.

Its climate is predominantly tropical, with low average temperature of 12 °C (period of July–August) and maximum average of 30 °C (period of January–February).

Politics
The mayors of Jaborandi:

March 26, 1949 - March 26, 1953 - Orlando Junqueira de Oliveira
March 27, 1953 - March 26, 1953 - Dr. Amadeu Pagliuso
March 27, 1957 - March 26, 1957 - Luiz Ferreira
March 27, 1961 - March 26, 1965 - Antônio Bruno
March 27, 1965 - March 26, 1969 - Luiz Ferreira  (re-elected)
March 27, 1969 - January 30, 1973 - João Manuel Diniz Junqueira
January 31, 1973 - January 31, 1977 - Luiz Ferreira (re-elected)
February 2, 1977 - January 31, 1983 - João Manuel Diniz Junqueira (re-elected)
February 2, 1983 - December 31, 1988 - José Baltazar dos Santos
January 1, 1989 - December 31, 1992 - João Paulo Pires da Silva
January 1, 1993 - December 12, 1996 - Silvio Vaz de Almeida
January 1, 1997 - December 31, 2000 - Jorge Assad Chabrour
January 1, 2001 - December 31, 2004 - Ronan Sales Cardozo
January 1, 2005 - December 31, 2008 - Marcoantonio Pinto Neto

References

Municipalities in São Paulo (state)